Takashi Kasahara may refer to:

Takashi Kasahara (footballer, born 1918)
Takashi Kasahara (footballer, born 1988)